Władysław Roman Orlicz (May 24, 1903 – August 9, 1990) was a Polish mathematician of Lwów School of Mathematics. His main interests were functional analysis and topology: Orlicz spaces are named after him.

Education and career 
Orlicz was the third of Franciszek and Maria Orlicz's five children. His youngest brother died in the Polish-Soviet War, the eldest perished in the Stutthof concentration camp. The other brothers also became professors. The family moved several times. Orlicz attended school in Tarnów, Znojmo, and Lviv, where he finished school in 1920 and began studying mathematics at the Lviv Polytechnic University. He studied with Hugo Steinhaus, Antoni Łomnicki and Stanisław Ruziewicz, among others. As early as 1923 he took on small tasks at the Faculty of Mathematics. On August 1, 1925 he became a junior assistant at the Jan Kazimierz University in Lemberg (now University of Lviv). He published his first scientific work in 1926 at the age of 23. In 1928 he completed his dissertation on the theory of orthogonal sequences. In 1929 he went to University of Göttingen on a scholarship and returned to Lemberg in 1930 as a senior assistant. In 1934 he presented his habilitation thesis The investigations of orthogonal systems. The following year he became an assistant professor at the Lviv Polytechnic University and received his teaching license at the University of Lviv. In 1937, he became an associate professor at the University of Poznań.

The outbreak of the Second World War surprised him while he was on vacation in Lemberg. Since he could not return to Poznań, he was appointed professor in Lemberg. Officially he worked as a teacher. When it became clear in early 1945 that Lemberg would no longer belong to Poland, Orlicz went back to Poznań. In 1948 he was appointed full professor at the University of Poznań, where he remained until his retirement in 1970.

Orlicz was awarded the Stefan Banach Prize by the Polish Mathematical Society in 1948.

See also
 Orlicz space
 Orlicz–Pettis theorem

External links

References 

1903 births
1990 deaths
Lwów School of Mathematics
Functional analysts
Topologists
Recipients of the State Award Badge (Poland)
People from Brzesko County
Lviv Polytechnic alumni
Academic staff of Adam Mickiewicz University in Poznań
Academic staff of Lviv Polytechnic
Academic staff of the University of Lviv
20th-century Polish mathematicians